The 2015 AFC U-19 Women's Championship was the 8th edition of the AFC U-19 Women's Championship, the biennial international youth football championship organised by the Asian Football Confederation (AFC) for the women's under-19 national teams of Asia. The tournament was held in China between 18–29 August 2015. A total of eight teams played in the tournament.

Same as previous editions, the tournament acted as the AFC qualifiers for the FIFA U-20 Women's World Cup. The top three teams of the tournament qualified for the 2016 FIFA U-20 Women's World Cup in Papua New Guinea as the AFC representatives.

Japan won their fourth title with a final victory over North Korea on penalties. Both finalists and third-placed South Korea qualified for the World Cup.

Qualification

The draw for the qualifiers was held on 17 June 2014. Four teams qualified directly for the final tournament by their 2013 performance, while the other entrants competed in the qualifying stage for the remaining four spots.

Qualified teams
The following eight teams qualified for the final tournament.

Venues
Nanjing hosted the tournament, with two venues: Jiangning Sports Center and Jiangsu Training Base Stadium.

Draw
The draw for the final tournament was held on 13 May 2015 at the AFC House in Kuala Lumpur. The eight teams were drawn into two groups of four teams. The teams were seeded according to their performance in the previous edition in 2013.

Squads

Players born between 1 January 1996 and 31 December 2000 were eligible to compete in the tournament. Each team can register a maximum of 23 players (minimum three of whom must be goalkeepers).

Group stage
The top two teams of each group advanced to the semi-finals.

Tiebreakers
The teams were ranked according to points (3 points for a win, 1 point for a draw, 0 points for a loss). If tied on points, tiebreakers were applied in the following order:
Greater number of points obtained in the group matches between the teams concerned;
Goal difference resulting from the group matches between the teams concerned;
Greater number of goals scored in the group matches between the teams concerned;
Goal difference in all the group matches;
Greater number of goals scored in all the group matches;
Penalty shoot-out if only two teams are involved and they are both on the field of play;
Fewer score calculated according to the number of yellow and red cards received in the group matches (1 point for a single yellow card, 3 points for a red card as a consequence of two yellow cards, 3 points for a direct red card, 4 points for a yellow card followed by a direct red card);
Drawing of lots.

All times were local, CST (UTC+8).

Group A

Group B

Knockout stage
In the knockout stage, extra time and penalty shoot-out were used to decide the winner if necessary.

Bracket

Semi-finals
Winners qualified for 2016 FIFA U-20 Women's World Cup.

Third place match
Winner qualified for 2016 FIFA U-20 Women's World Cup.

Final

Winners

Qualified teams for FIFA U-20 Women's World Cup
The following three teams from AFC qualified for the FIFA U-20 Women's World Cup.

1 Bold indicates champion for that year. Italic indicates host for that year.

Awards
The following awards were given at the conclusion of the tournament.

Goalscorers
6 goals

 Ri Un-sim

4 goals

 Rikako Kobayashi
 Son Hwa-yeon
 Saowalak Pengngam

3 goals

 Xiao Yuyi
 Yan Jinjin
 Kiko Seike
 Ri Kyong-hyang
 Namgung Ye-ji
 Jang Chang
 Wie Jae-eun
 Jenjira Bubpha

2 goals

 Shi Tianlun
 Mizuki Sonoda
 Jon So-yon
 Choi Hee-jeong
 Hwang Hye-soo

1 goal

 Amy Harrison
 Ayesha Kirby
 Chloe O'Brien
 Liu Yan
 Pan Jiahui
 Qin Manman
 Zhang Zhu
 Sara Zohrabi
 Yui Hasegawa
 Hikaru Kitagawa
 Meika Nishida
 Choe Un-hwa
 Kim Phyong-hwa
 Kim So-hyang
 Ri Hui-jong
 Ri Hyang-sim
 Wi Jong-sim
 Park Yee-un
 Song Ji-yoon

Own goal

 Wang Ying (playing against South Korea)
 Shokhida Tojiddinova (playing against China PR)

References

External links
, the-AFC.com

 
2015
U-19 Women's Championship
2015 in women's association football
2015
2015 in Chinese football
2015 in youth association football
Sport in Nanjing